Batui is an Austronesian language spoken by a small group of people on the eastern peninsula of the island of Sulawesi.

References

Saluan–Banggai languages
Languages of Sulawesi